The molecular formula C23H31NO2 may refer to: 

 Acetylmethadol, also known as methadyl acetate
 Alphacetylmethadol
 Betacetylmethadol
 Levacetylmethadol
 Motretinide
 Proadifen 

Molecular formulas